Dance Tracks Vol.1 is Namie Amuro's debut studio album and only release through Toshiba-EMI. Nine days after Dance Tracks Vol.1 hit stores, she released her first single with Avex Trax, "Body Feels Exit" on 25 October 1995. The album reached the top position on the Oricon charts and charted for forty-four weeks.

Background
Released three months after the final Super Monkey's' single, Dance Tracks Vol.1 could almost be classified as more of a remix album than an original album. Six out of the seven Super Monkey's singles appear on the album, all of which have been remixed. Out of the 11 tracks on the album only three were previously unreleased. The first of those three new songs kicks off the album, "Go! Go!: Yume no Hayasade." Following the trend of the last three Super Monkey's singles, it is a cover of the eurobeat song "Go Go" by DJ NRG. The other two new songs, "Get My Shinin'" and "Super Luck!" are original pop compositions.

The other members of the "Super Monkey's" appear within the artwork of the album, but are not credited with any vocals. They are also not given credit for the album. All seven original Super Monkey's single were accredited to both Amuro and the group. Following the massive success of this album and her next release, Sweet 19 Blues (1996) through Avex Trax, Toshiba-EMI released a "best of" compilation containing all original Super Monkey's a-sides and b-sides entitled, Original Tracks Vol.1 (1996).

In the history of Japanese Oricon albums chart, Dance Tracks Vol.1 ranked at the 88th best selling album of all time, with cumulative physical sales of over 1.8 million copies . In 1996, the album was certified two million by the Recording Industry Association of Japan.

Track listing

Personnel 
 Namie Amuro - vocals, background vocals
 Producers - Masato 'Max' Masato, Yukihito Sakakibara
 Mixing - Naoki Yamada, Yoshinori Kaji, Koji Morimoto
 Remixing - Yasuhiko Hoshino, Satoshi Hidaka
 Photography - Takayuki Okada
 Art Direction - Kumiko Izumiya

Charts

References 

Namie Amuro albums
1995 debut albums